The Vault - Vol. 1 is a 2003 album by the American R&B singer and songwriter Eric Roberson. It is the second album release for the Eric Roberson after his first album, Esoteric and Esoteric Movement. The Vault, Vol.1 would later have songs that were re-recorded by other artists such as Carl Thomas, Musiq Soulchild, Dwele and others, which would cause Eric Roberson to release a newer version of the album with update songs to replace those that artists recorded and call that album The Vault, Vol 1.5.

Track listing
"She Couldn't Hear Me (Over the Music)" - 4:18
"Past Paradise" - 4:32
"Rock with You" - 4:52
"Please Don't Leave Me" - 4:14
"Hold On" - 3:40
"Rain on My Parade" - 5:24
"Rebound" - 4:06
"Should We Try" - 4:36
"One Time" - 3:55
"When Love Calls" - 4:11
"Be with You" - 4:55

Neo soul albums
Eric Roberson albums